is a Japanese company owned by NTT Docomo; it operates "d-anime store", a video on demand service specializing in anime.

Overview 
The service was established first in May 2012 as a result of strategic alliance between NTT Docomo and Kadokawa, In July of the same year, it began operating the "Anime Store" (later d-anime store) on d-market.  and has been a sponsor of AnimeJapan since 2014, 2015, 2016, and 2017. in July 2018 it was announced that a d-anime store channel will open in Amazon Prime (Japan).

At the beginning of the service, it was an anime distribution service limited to docomo carriers, but with the carrier-free service on April 1, 2014, it became available to anyone without a docomo line subscription. It also started selling anime-related goods and watching anime songs on March 23, 2016, making it a comprehensive anime service. It is linked to Animate, and anime-related goods can be purchased from the Animate Online Shop.

On July 26, 2015, the number of members exceeded 2 million. The main demographic of members is people in their 20s and 30s, and about 40% of members are women. As of August 2019, there are about 47,676 episodes of 2.5D musicals and about 2,942 anime and anime songs, making it the largest subscription anime distribution service in Japan.

D-Anime Store Awards 
The anime awards have multiple categories. Such as

 Recommended Anime
 Anime with interesting developments
 Anime with a Good Worldview
 Best Story
 Hottest Anime
 Heart-warming anime

References

External links 

 Docomo Anime Store Co., Ltd.
 d-anime store

Video on demand services
Japanese entertainment websites